The 1881 Spanish general election was held on Sunday, 21 August and on Friday, 2 September 1881, to elect the 2nd Restoration Cortes of the Kingdom of Spain. All 392 seats in the Congress of Deputies were up for election, as well as 180 of 360 seats in the Senate.

Though formally competitive, the 1881 general election was held under the recently developed system of turno pacifico; in accordance with a semi-formal power-sharing arrangement brokered by Antonio Cánovas del Castillo, elections—under influence by machine bosses called caciques—served as a rubber stamp for a routine handover of power initiated by the King. The 1881 election, as expected, sanctioned the pre-arranged handover from the Conservatives to the newly-created Liberal Fusionist Party. From 1881 until the end of the constitutional monarchy, the turno power-sharing plan would continue dominating the Spanish political landscape nearly uninterruptedly.

Overview

Background

Electoral system
The Spanish Cortes were envisaged as "co-legislative bodies", based on a nearly perfect bicameralism. Both the Congress of Deputies and the Senate had legislative, control and budgetary functions, sharing equal powers except for laws on contributions or public credit, where the Congress had preeminence. Voting for the Cortes was on the basis of censitary suffrage, which comprised national males over twenty-five, being taxpayers with a minimum quota of twenty-five pesetas per territorial contribution or fifty per industrial subsidy, as well as being enrolled in the so-called capacity census (either by criteria of Education or for professional reasons).

For the Congress of Deputies, 88 seats were elected using a partial block voting in 26 multi-member constituencies, with the remaining 304 being elected under a one-round first-past-the-post system in single-member districts. Candidates winning a plurality in each constituency were elected. In constituencies electing eight seats, electors could vote for up to six candidates; in those with seven seats, for up to five candidates; in those with six seats, for up to four; in those with four or five seats, for up to three candidates; and for one candidate in single-member districts. Additionally, up to ten deputies could be elected through cumulative voting in several single-member constituencies, provided that they obtained more than 10,000 votes overall. The Congress was entitled to one member per each 50,000 inhabitants, with each multi-member constituency being allocated a fixed number of seats: 8 for Madrid, 5 for Barcelona and Palma, 4 for Seville and 3 for Alicante, Almería, Badajoz, Burgos, Cádiz, Cartagena, Córdoba, Granada, Jaén, Jerez de la Frontera, La Coruña, Lugo, Málaga, Murcia, Oviedo, Pamplona, Santa Cruz de Tenerife, Santander, Tarragona, Valencia, Valladolid and Zaragoza. The law also provided for by-elections to fill seats vacated throughout the legislature.

For the Senate, 180 seats were indirectly elected, with electors voting for delegates instead of senators. Elected delegates—equivalent in number to one-sixth of the councillors in each municipal corporation—would then vote for senators using a write-in, two-round majority voting system. The provinces of Álava, Albacete, Ávila, Biscay, Cuenca, Guadalajara, Guipúzcoa, Huelva, Logroño, Matanzas, Palencia, Pinar del Río, Puerto Príncipe, Santa Clara, Santander, Santiago de Cuba, Segovia, Soria, Teruel, Valladolid and Zamora were allocated two seats each, whereas each of the remaining provinces was allocated three seats, for a total of 147. The remaining 33 were allocated to a number of institutions, electing one seat each—the Archdioceses of Burgos, Granada, Santiago de Compostela, Santiago de Cuba, Seville, Tarragona, Toledo, Valencia, Valladolid and Zaragoza; the Royal Spanish Academy; the Royal Academies of History, Fine Arts, Sciences, Moral and Political Sciences and Medicine; the Universities of Madrid, Barcelona, Granada, Havana, Oviedo, Salamanca, Santiago, Seville, Valencia, Valladolid and Zaragoza; and the Economic Societies of Friends of the Country from Madrid, Barcelona, Cuba–Puerto Rico, León, Seville and Valencia. An additional 180 seats comprised senators in their own right—the Monarch's offspring and the heir apparent once coming of age; Grandees of Spain of the first class; Captain Generals of the Army and the Navy Admiral; the Patriarch of the Indies and archbishops; as well as other high-ranking state figures—and senators for life (who were appointed by the Monarch).

Election date
The term of each House of the Cortes—the Congress and one-half of the elective part of the Senate—expired five years from the date of their previous election, unless they were dissolved earlier. The Monarch had the prerogative to dissolve both Houses at any given time—either jointly or separately—and call a snap election.

Results

Congress of Deputies

Overall
Mainland Spain

Cuba

Elected deputies
The following table lists the elected deputies:

By-elections

Senate

References

Bibliography

External links
Historical archive of deputies (1810–1977). Congress of Deputies (in Spanish).
Elections in the Revolutionary Sexennium and the Restoration. Historia Electoral.com (in Spanish).

1881 elections in Spain
1881 in Spain
1881
August 1881 events